The University of California, Davis, School of Veterinary Medicine is the largest veterinary school in the United States. Established in 1948, the school is the primary health resource for California's various animal populations. In 2020, the school was again ranked No. 1 in the United States by U.S. News & World Report and in 2022, ranked No. 2 in the world by QS World University Rankings.  The school is located in the southwest corner of the main campus of the University of California, Davis. The current Dean of Veterinary Medicine is Dr. Mark Stetter.

The School focuses on students of the professional Doctor of Veterinary Medicine program, the Master of Preventive Veterinary Medicine program, graduate clinical residency programs, and graduate academic MS and PhD programs. The School of Veterinary Medicine provides educational, research, clinical service, and public service programs to advance the health and care of animals, the health of the environment, and public health.

The School addresses the health of all animals, including livestock, poultry, companion animals, captive and free-ranging wildlife, exotic animals, birds, aquatic mammals and fish, and animals used in biological and medical research. The School's expertise also encompasses related human health concerns, such as public health and the concept of One Health.

The School runs 28 research and clinical programs, including clinical referral services; diagnostic testing services; continuing education; extension; and community outreach.

Departments
The School consists of six different academic departments:
 Anatomy, Physiology & Cell Biology
 Molecular Biosciences
 Medicine and Epidemiology
 Pathology, Microbiology & Immunology
 Population Health and Reproduction
 Surgical and Radiological Sciences

The School switched to a new DVM curriculum starting with the class of 2015. This curriculum had been in development for 5 years. In the new curriculum, 75% of the material is didactic curriculum core material and 25% is elective material. In the first year, students gain a solid understanding of the normal structure, function and homeostasis of animals. Year two is focused on pathophysiology and mechanisms of disease of animals. The third year is aimed at teaching the manifestations of animal diseases including history, diagnosis, therapeutic and prevention strategies. The fourth year is clinical work, which is broken up into nine different tracks from which a student may choose. The tracks are Equine Track, Equine/Small Animal Track, Food Animal Track, Food/Small Animal Track, Large Animal Track, Mixed Animal Track, Small Animal Track, Zoological Track and Individual Track.

Veterinary Medical Teaching Hospital

The William R. Pritchard Veterinary Medical Teaching Hospital (VMTH) at the University of California, Davis — a unit of the School of Veterinary Medicine — is open to the public. Faculty and resident clinicians along with supervised students treat more than 50,000 animals a year, ranging from cats and dogs to horses, cows, and exotic species. The current hospital, along with five support buildings, opened in 1970. The VMTH provides training opportunities and clinical experiences for DVM students and post graduate veterinarian residents. These residents are trained under the faculty's tutelage to be board-certified specialists in one of 34 specialty areas.

Notable Programs
The School of Veterinary Medicine was on the forefront of research into the 2007 pet food recalls.. Other areas of research include chronic progressive lymphedema in horses and H1N1 influenza.

Under the terms of a Memorandum of Understanding with the California Department of Fish and Game, the school's Wildlife Health Center administers the Oiled Wildlife Care Network (OWCN) on behalf of the government of California. OWCN directly operates facilities for the cleaning and rehabilitation of oiled wildlife at Cordelia and San Pedro, and in emergencies can also draw upon the resources of 23 participating organizations.

The SeaDoc Society is an affiliated nonprofit with the veterinary school and the schools Karen C. Drayer Wildlife Health Center.

Discoveries and Distinctions

 Leads the nation's 30 accredited veterinary schools and colleges with more than $70 million in annual research funding.
 Faculty members that have been honored as members of the National Academy of Sciences or National Academy of Medicine include: Roy Doi, Bruce Hammock, Harris Lewin, Jonna Mazet, Stephen Barthold, Patricia Conrad, Tilahun Yilma, Michael Lairmore and Christine Kreuder Johnson.
 Five faculty members (Terrell Holliday [1998]; Gary P Carlson [2004]; Richard W Nelson [2012]; Bradford Smith [2019]; and Mark D Kittleson [2022]) have received the prestigious Robert W. Kirk Award for Professional Excellence from the American College of Veterinary Internal Medicine in recognition of outstanding achievements and dedicated service to the veterinary profession.Robert W. Kirk Award
 The PREDICT initiative, led by the school's One Health Institute, was awarded $175 million by USAID to help detect and respond to emerging infectious diseases in more than 30 countries worldwide. Infectious disease scientists developed SpillOver open-source web application developed, launched in 2021 during the Covid-19 pandemic as a virus and host risk assessment tool
 Pioneered animal DNA Testing, including the discovery of a mutation in gene NKX2-8, that causes spinal dysraphism in dogs and could show clues about neural tube defects in humans, including spina bifida and anencephaly.
 Pioneered a new mandibular reconstruction procedure. Whiskey, a Munsterlander dog, received mandibular reconstruction after losing his jaw due to a cancerous growth. This new procedure uses a titanium plate in the form of a jawbone which contains a bone growth protein. Over time, the cells proliferate and give rise to an artificial jaw made of material that resembles natural bone.
 Identified mutations in the genes DLX5, DLX6 and ADAMTS20 that are associated with cleft palate and cleft lips in dogs and humans.
 Researchers first described simian immunodeficiency viruses (SIV) in monkeys and feline immunodeficiency viruses (FIV) in cats, which became the earliest animal models for AIDS research.
 In 1989, the International Laboratory of Molecular Biology for Tropical Disease and virologist Tilahun Yilma developed a genetically engineered vaccine for rinderpest and an inexpensive diagnostic kit designed to be stable under field conditions. In areas of Africa that depend on cattle for meat, milk products, and work, the rinderpest virus has caused famine and economic damage -$500 million in one outbreak of the 1980s.
 Much of the School's research focuses on identifying, treating, and preventing various diseases in animals. The J-5 vaccine against the E. coli infections that lead to bovine mastitis was formulated as a result of research conducted at UC Davis.
 Notable discoveries by faculty of the School include feline immunodeficiency virus (FIV), taurine deficiency as the cause of dilated cardiomyopathy (DCM) in domestic cats, and the first genetic cause of a heart disease in domestic cats (hypertrophic cardiomyopathy (HCM)).

References

External links
 UC Davis School of Veterinary Medicine Homepage
 William R. Pritchard Veterinary Medical Teaching Hospital

Veterinary
Educational institutions established in 1948
California
1948 establishments in California